Neoregelia tristis is a species of flowering plant in the genus Neoregelia. This species is endemic to Brazil.

Cultivars
 Neoregelia 'Alex D. Hawkes'
 Neoregelia 'Alpha'
 Neoregelia 'Apples and Cheese'
 Neoregelia 'Bewdy'
 Neoregelia 'Diana'
 Neoregelia 'Dr. Carl'
 Neoregelia 'Fancy Nancy'
 Neoregelia 'First Prize'
 Neoregelia 'Frances Spire (Frances)'
 Neoregelia 'Good Morning'
 Neoregelia 'Lady Di'
 Neoregelia 'Looking Good'
 Neoregelia 'Midnight'
 Neoregelia 'Mini Misso'
 Neoregelia 'Nez Misso'
 Neoregelia 'Ouija'
 Neoregelia 'Purple Magic'
 Neoregelia 'Purple Pleasure'
 Neoregelia 'Spots And Dots'
 Neoregelia 'Spotted Beauty'
 Neoregelia 'Spotty Scotty'
 Neoregelia 'Tramp'
 Neoregelia 'Violetta'
 Neoregelia 'Wow'

References

BSI Cultivar Registry Retrieved 11 October 2009

tristis
Flora of Brazil